Curculionichthys is a genus of fish in the family Loricariidae native to South America.

Species
There are currently 9 recognized species in this genus:
 Curculionichthys coxipone Roxo, G. S. C. Silva, L. E. Ochoa & C. de Oliveira, 2015 
 Curculionichthys insperatus (Britski & Garavello, 2003)
 Curculionichthys karipuna G. S. C. Silva, Roxo, B. F. de Melo & C. de Oliveira, 2016 
 Curculionichthys luteofrenatus (Britski & Garavello, 2007) 
 Curculionichthys oliveirai (Roxo, Zawadzki & Troy, 2014) 
 Curculionichthys paresi (Roxo, Zawadzki & Troy, 2014) 
 Curculionichthys piracanjuba (Martins & Langeani, 2012) 
 Curculionichthys sabaji Roxo, G. S. C. Silva, L. E. Ochoa & C. de Oliveira, 2015 
 Curculionichthys sagarana Roxo, G. S. C. Silva, L. E. Ochoa & C. de Oliveira, 2015

References

Loricariidae
Fish of South America
Catfish genera
Taxa named by Fabio F. Roxo
Taxa named by Gabriel de Souza da Costa e Silva
Taxa named by Luz Eneida Ochoa Orrego
Taxa named by Claudio Oliveira (scientist),
Freshwater fish genera